Joker is an unincorporated community in Calhoun County, West Virginia, United States. Its post office is closed.

The community was named after Joker Sewel, a local merchant. The village once had a store, post office and the Bryner Chapel Methodist Church. The store was operated for many years by the Bryners, Dawsons and Gainers.

References 

Unincorporated communities in West Virginia
Unincorporated communities in Calhoun County, West Virginia